Ben Nighthorse Campbell (born April 13, 1933) is an American Cheyenne politician who represented Colorado's 3rd congressional district in the United States House of Representatives from 1987 to 1993 and was a United States Senator from Colorado from 1993 to 2005. He serves as one of 44 members of the Council of Chiefs of the Northern Cheyenne Indian Tribe. During his time in office, he was the only Native American serving in Congress. He was the last Native American elected to the U.S. Senate until the 2022 election of Cherokee Markwayne Mullin.

Originally a member of the Democratic Party, Campbell switched to the Republican Party on March 3, 1995. Reelected to the Senate in 1998, Campbell announced in March 2004 that he would not run for a third term. His seat was won by Democrat Ken Salazar in the November 2004 election. Campbell later expressed interest in running for governor of Colorado in 2006, but on January 4, 2006, announced that he would not enter the race. He later became a lobbyist for the law and lobbying firm Holland & Knight and afterward co-founded his own lobbying firm, Ben Nighthorse Consultants.

Early life
Campbell was born Benny Campbell in Auburn, California. His mother, Mary Vierra (Vieira), was a Portuguese immigrant who had come with her mother to the U.S. at age six through Ellis Island. According to Campbell, his maternal grandfather had entered the U.S. some time before. The Vierra family settled in the large Portuguese community near Sacramento. When Mary Vierra contracted tuberculosis in her youth, she was forced to convalesce at a nearby hospital, often for months at a time during treatment. It was there that she met an American Indian patient, Albert Campbell, who was at the hospital for alcoholism treatment. Albert Campbell was of predominantly Northern Cheyenne descent but, according to Campbell biographer Herman Viola, spent much of his youth in Crow Agency boarding school and may have had some Pueblo Indian and Apache Indian ancestry as well. The couple married in 1929, and Ben Campbell was born in 1933.

During Campbell's childhood, his father continued to have problems with alcoholism, often leaving the family for weeks and months at a time. His mother continued to have problems with tuberculosis, a highly contagious disease that limited the contact she could have with her children and continued to force her into the hospital for long periods. These problems led Ben and his sister, Alberta (who died in an apparent suicide at age 44), to spend much of their early lives in nearby Catholic orphanages. As a young man, Campbell was introduced to the Japanese martial art of judo by Japanese immigrant families he met while working in local agricultural fields.

Military service and education
Campbell attended Placer High School, dropping out in 1951 to join the U.S. Air Force. He was stationed in Korea during the Korean War as an air policeman; he left the Air Force in 1953 with the rank of Airman Second Class, as well as the Korean Service Medal and the Air Medal. While in the Air Force, Campbell obtained his GED and, after his discharge, used the G.I. Bill to attend San Jose State University, graduating in 1957 with a Bachelor of Arts in physical education and fine arts.

He is listed as Ben M. Campbell in his college records and records of his Olympic competition, but was given the name "Nighthorse" when he returned to the Northern Cheyenne reservation for his name-giving ceremony, as a member of his father's family, Blackhorse.

Career

Sports 
In college, Campbell was a member of the San Jose State judo team, coached by future USA Olympic coach Yosh Uchida. While training for the Olympic Games, Campbell attended Meiji University in Tokyo, Japan, as a special research student from 1960 to 1964. The Meiji team was world-renowned and Campbell credited the preparation and discipline taught at Meiji for his 1961, 1962, and 1963 U.S. National titles and his gold medal in the 1963 Pan-American Games. In 1964, Campbell competed in judo at the 1964 Summer Olympics in Tokyo. This made him the first Native American on the U.S. Olympic judo team. He suffered an injury and did not win a medal. He broke his ankle and was out for two years.

In the years after returning from the Olympic Games, Campbell worked as a deputy sheriff in Sacramento County, California, coached the U.S. national judo team, operated his own dojo in Sacramento, and taught high school (physical education and art classes). He and his wife also raised quarterhorses, including a Supreme Champion and AQHA Champion, Sailors Night. They bought a ranch near Ignacio, Colorado, on the Southern Ute reservation in 1978.

Jewelry 
In Herman Viola's book Ben Nighthorse Campbell: An American Warrior, Campbell recounts learning to make jewelry from his father and flattening silver dollars on train tracks for the materials. He also used techniques learned from sword makers in Japan and other non-traditional techniques to win over 200 national and international awards for jewelry design under the name Ben Nighthorse, and in the late 1970s was included in a feature article in Arizona Highways magazine about Native artists experimenting in the "new look" of Indian jewelry. Campbell has works on display with the Art of the Olympians organization.

Politics 
Campbell was elected to the Colorado State Legislature as a Democrat in November 1982, and served two terms. He was voted one of the 10 Best Legislators by his colleagues in a 1986 Denver Post – News Center 4 survey.

Congress

In 1986, Campbell was elected to the U.S. House of Representatives, defeating incumbent Mike Strang; he was reelected twice to this seat. In 1989, he authored the bill HR 2668 to establish the National Museum of the American Indian, which became PL 101–185.

Senate
The early 1990s marked a turning point in Campbell's political career. In 1992, after Senator Tim Wirth announced his retirement, Campbell won a three-way Democratic primary against former three-term Governor Richard Lamm and Boulder County Commissioner Josie Heath, who had been the party's nominee in 1990. During the primary campaign, Lamm supporters accused Heath of "spoiling" the election by splitting the vote of the party's left wing. Heath's campaign argued that it was Campbell who should not have run, because his voting record in Congress had been much more like that of a Republican. Campbell won the primary with 45% of the vote and defeated Republican State Senator Terry Considine in the general election. He was the first Native American elected to the United States Senate since Charles Curtis in the 1920s.

In March 1995, after two years in office, Campbell switched parties from Democratic to Republican in the wake of publicized disputes he had with the Colorado Democratic Party. Campbell said the last straw was the Senate's defeat of the balanced-budget amendment, which he had championed since coming to Washington as a congressman in 1987. Others attributed the switch to personal hostility within the Democratic Party in Colorado.

In 1998, Campbell was reelected to the Senate by what was then the largest margin in Colorado history for a statewide race. After winning reelection, Campbell identified as a moderate Republican, saying that his reelection "shows the moderate voices within the Republican Party are dominating". During President Bill Clinton's impeachment trail, Campbell voted to convict Clinton on both articles of impeachment against him; in his final statement before the vote, he said: "I took a solemn oath. Simply speaking, the president did too. And, so even though I like him personally, I find I can only vote one way. And that is guilty on both articles." Clinton was acquitted on both counts as neither received the necessary two-thirds majority vote of the senators present for conviction and removal from office.

In the 106th Congress, Campbell passed more public laws than any other member of Congress. During his tenure, he also became the first American Indian to chair the Senate Indian Affairs Committee. While in the Senate, Campbell voted to support the Supreme Court's Roe v. Wade decision. He gradually became more conservative during his tenure, reversing his position on late-term abortions and voting for the Defense of Marriage Act. However, in 2004, he was one of six Republicans who voted against the Federal Marriage Amendment, a constitutional amendment intended to ban same-sex marriage, on the grounds that it should be left to the states.

The Senate Ethics Committee investigated accusations that Campbell's former chief of staff, Virginia Kontnik, inflated bonuses to an aide in 2002 so he could return the money to her. In subsequent interviews, Kontnik claimed that Campbell had approved the deal, which he denied.

After the prisoner abuse in Iraq by American military personnel and viewing unpublished abuse images alongside Defense Secretary Donald Rumsfeld's Senate testimony, Campbell admonished the administration and military leadership: "I don't know how the hell these people got into our army."

On March 3, 2004, Campbell announced that he would not seek reelection due to health concerns, having recently been treated for prostate cancer and heartburn. He retired from office in January 2005, later saying of his decision: "Somewhere along the line, I said 'I'm not gonna die in this place. I want to do what I can, but I'm not dying here.'" He is the last Republican to be elected to the Class 3 Senate seat from Colorado.

Post-congressional work 

After his retirement, Campbell was a senior policy advisor at the firm of Holland and Knight, LLP, in Washington, D.C. In 2012, he left that firm to found Ben Nighthorse Consultants, a new lobbying firm.  He also continues to design and craft his Ben Nighthorse line of American Indian jewelry.

Completed in 2011, Lake Nighthorse, a  reservoir in southwestern Colorado, is named in his honor.

Campbell is a member of the ReFormers Caucus of Issue One.

In 2008, during the Cherokee freedmen controversy, Campbell authored a piece in The Hill criticizing the efforts of members of Congress attempting to terminate recognition of the Cherokee Nation's government, and condemning the lawmakers' "paternalistic efforts": 

Campbell endorsed then-Ohio governor John Kasich in the 2016 Republican presidential primaries.

In July 2016, Campbell spoke to Colorado Public Radio about regretting his support of the Iraq War: "I have some misgivings about the way I voted but we were voting on the best information that we had at the time. I think if there was a weakness early on [it] is that the administration had several people in there really pushing for American involvement...In retrospect after seeing that there [were] no weapons of mass destruction and that we did not have really good intelligence on the ground to give us some guidance on how we should proceed, I now look back and think maybe I shouldn't have voted the way I did."

In late 2018, Campbell joined several former Republican and Democratic senators in signing a letter supporting then-Special Counsel Robert Mueller's investigation into alleged Russian collusion in the 2016 election. But he opposed the impeachment of President Donald Trump, defending Trump and calling it "a waste of time". He also questioned why the Democrats would move to impeach knowing they would fail to convict in the Senate, saying, "The cost of this and what it does to the country, it kind of tears the fabric of the nation apart."

In June 2020, Campbell appeared on Breitbart News radio to respond to and defend Trump's use of the Veterans' Memorial Preservation Act, which Campbell had introduced while in the Senate in 2003, to defend American statues during the civil unrest. During the interview he voiced his disgust at the vandalizing of war memorials around the country, and also defended the statue of Andrew Jackson that had been targeted by rioters and vandals: "Leave it there, but tell the whole story. I don't think you can rewrite history to only tell your point of view. Seems to me, if we're really going to learn from history so that we don't make the same dumb mistakes, we must look at the bad things that happened at the same time...but to do away with it, I don't think it's the right thing. You know, you can't sanitize history by getting rid of all the symbols of oppression." Campbell compared the destruction of statues to the Taliban's destruction of cultural and religious sites, and said the law must be enforced to protect the monuments or otherwise, "We're in for a full-fledged insurrection if we don't stop it." He also condemned the violence in the 2020 protests: "A lot of this is driven by, in my view, people who are basically anarchists. They want to change our whole national structure, and a little bit of white guilt thrown in there, too. There's just a better way to do it if people don't want those statues to remain, because where does it end?" He concluded the interview by saying, "I think part of the learning process and teaching our kids is not to totally sanitize things by getting rid of the things that we didn't like from the old days. We need to explain it to our youngsters why the bad things happened."

In October 2020, Campbell appeared on Indian Country Today to speak on a variety of issues, including his party switch in 1995 and promoting free enterprise for Native Americans. He defended his switch to the Republican Party, and when asked whether its policies were better for Native peoples, he replied: "The head of the Ku Klux Klan was not a Republican, it was a Democrat. It wasn't a Republican who put 350,000 Japanese Americans in prison without any legal authority to do it, that was a Democrat, Roosevelt. And Andrew Jackson drove the Trail of Tears, of the Cherokees, the Chickasaws, the Choctaws, and many other tribes, taking their land by force. That wasn't a Republican that did that. That was a Democrat… so when people say the Democrat Party has been more willing to help Native Americans, I dispute that. That's not true." He went on to say how optimistic he was that more Native people were becoming involved and running for office, expressed support for Trump and his immigration policies, and voiced his concern with the rise of antifa.

In September 2021, Campbell endorsed Olympic athlete and Air Force veteran Eli Bremer in the Colorado Republican primary for the 2022 senate race to challenge Democrat Michael Bennet. After Bremer lost the primary, Campbell endorsed Republican nominee Joe O'Dea in June 2022.

Personal life

In 1966, Campbell married the former Linda Price, a public school teacher who was a native of Colorado. They have two children and four grandchildren.

Linda Campbell was the sponsor of USS Mesa Verde (LPD 19) on January 15, 2005.

Lake Nighthorse in La Plata County, Colorado, is named in Campbell's honor.

Electoral history

1982

1984

1986

1988

1990

1992

1998

Honors
 Grand-Officer of the Order of Prince Henry, Portugal (1 June 1998)

2008: Awarded Ellis Island Medal of Freedom

2011: Conferral of the Order of the Rising Sun, Gold Rays with Neck Ribbon by Japanese Emperor Akihito. Sen. Ben Nighthorse Campbell's award is in recognition of his significant contribution in the promotions and mutual understanding between Japan, the United States.

November 2021: Inducted into National Native American Hall of Fame in Oklahoma City, OK.

See also
 List of American politicians who switched parties in office
List of Native American artists
List of Native Americans in the United States Congress
List of Native American politicians
Native American jewelry
List of United States senators who switched parties

References

External links

 
 Retrospective Editorial, Boulder Weekly (2008): "Cherry Pickers Lose Elections"

|-

|-

|-

|-

|-

|-

|-

1933 births
20th-century American politicians
21st-century American politicians
20th-century Native Americans
21st-century Native Americans
American athlete-politicians
American male judoka
United States Air Force personnel of the Korean War
American people of Azorean descent
Northern Cheyenne people
Colorado Republicans
Democratic Party United States senators from Colorado
Judoka at the 1964 Summer Olympics
Living people
Meiji University alumni
Members of the Colorado House of Representatives
Military personnel from California
Native American jewelers
Native American leaders
Native American members of the United States Congress
Native American Roman Catholics
Native American sportspeople
Democratic Party members of the United States House of Representatives from Colorado
Native American state legislators
Native American United States military personnel
Olympic judoka of the United States
Pan American Games medalists in judo
People from Auburn, California
Placer High School alumni
Ranchers from Colorado
Recipients of the Air Medal
Republican Party United States senators from Colorado
San Jose State University alumni
United States Air Force airmen
Holland & Knight people
Pan American Games gold medalists for the United States
Catholics from California
Judoka at the 1963 Pan American Games
Medalists at the 1963 Pan American Games
Members of Congress who became lobbyists
Recipients of the Order of the Rising Sun